The North Branch Little River is a  tributary of the Little River in southern Maine. It is part of the Presumpscot River watershed, which flows to Casco Bay in the Atlantic Ocean.

The North Branch rises near the center of the town of Standish in Cumberland County and flows east, crossing into Gorham.

See also
List of rivers of Maine

References

Maine Streamflow Data from the USGS
Maine Watershed Data From Environmental Protection Agency

Rivers of Maine